Moghalpura is one of the oldest neighbourhoods in Hyderabad, India, dating back to the Qutub Shahi era. It is part of the old city of Hyderabad. This neighbourhood is very close to the historic Charminar.

Transport
Moghalpura is connected by buses run by TSRTC, and since a bus depot is close by, it is well connected. Buses that run are 65.

The closest MMTS train station is at Dabirpura.

References

Neighbourhoods in Hyderabad, India